Nossa Senhora de Lourdes may refer to:
 Nossa Senhora de Lourdes, Sergipe
 Nossa Senhora de Lourdes, Azores
 Nossa Senhora de Lourdes, Lajes do Pico
 Nossa Senhora de Lourdes, Santa Maria

See also  
 Nossa Senhora (disambiguation)
 Notre Dame de Lourdes (disambiguation)